The 1875 Armagh City by-election was held on 18 October 1875.  The byelection was fought due to the death of the incumbent Conservative MP, John Vance.  It was won by the Conservative candidate George Beresford.

References

1875 elections in the United Kingdom
19th century in County Armagh
Politics of Armagh (city)
By-elections to the Parliament of the United Kingdom in County Armagh constituencies
October 1875 events
1875 elections in Ireland